The Federación Internacional de Fútbol Rápido, commonly known by the acronym FIFRA, was the international governing body of indoor soccer (Spanish: fútbol rápido). From 2008–2013 FIFRA was responsible for the organization and governance of indoor soccer's major international tournaments. In North America, the MASL umbrella of leagues were official affiliates of FIFRA, including the Professional Arena Soccer League and Premier Arena Soccer League.

Member countries

Board of directors
  Alejandro Burillo – President
  Sergio del Rio – CEO
  Hector Zarate – Treasurer
  Christian Prevost – Secretary general
  John Stellato – executive member
  Kevin Milliken – Vice-chair
  Alfredo Maccise – Vice-chair
  Hector de La Vega – Vice-chair
  Erich Geyer – Member
  Pedro Monzon – Member

References

Indoor soccer
Association football governing bodies
Sports organizations established in 2008